NeoCD is a Neo Geo CD emulator written by Fabrice Martinez. It features full sound emulation, playback of the Red Book (audio CD standard) music tracks, and support of both joysticks.

Source ports

Emulation
Neo4All is an emulator specifically made for the Dreamcast.  In addition to allowing multiple games on one disc, Neo4All is often used to burn single disc emulators for games which are more graphically tolling, such as Metal Slug.  One method often used to fix GFX problems is to turn off the sound at the main menu.

References

External links
 Fosters' NeoCD/SDL
 Chui's Neo4All
 quzar's NeoDC
 evilo's NeoCD/PS2

Neo Geo emulators
Free video game console emulators